Frank E. Eulner (born 1963) is a sound editor who is also a member of Skywalker Sound. He was nominated for Best Sound Editing for the film Iron Man at the 81st Academy Awards. His nomination was shared with Christopher Boyes.

He has over 70 sound editing credits since 1986.

References

External links
 

1963 births
American sound editors
Living people